Eupithecia cervina is a moth in the family Geometridae. It is found in south-western China (Tibet).

The wingspan is about 26 mm. The fore- and hindwings are uniform mid brown.

References

Moths described in 2004
cervina
Moths of Asia